Gold River 21 is a Mi'kmaq reserve located in Lunenburg County, Nova Scotia. The population was 95 in 2016.

It is administratively part of the Acadia First Nation.

Indian reserves in Nova Scotia
Communities in Lunenburg County, Nova Scotia
Mi'kmaq in Canada